Mines ParisTech: Professional Ranking of World Universities is a University ranking by the French Grande école Mines ParisTech.

Methodology 
The ranking is based on the number of alumni currently holding the post of CEO in one of the 500 largest companies in the world according to the Fortune Global 500 ranking established by the American business magazine Fortune.

Ranking

2011 University Ranking 
These are the highest ranking 37 institutions (out of 392):

Regional ranking

North America

Europe

Analysis 
This ranking is more international than certain other rankings because it uses the Fortune Global 500.  It does not concentrate only on English-speaking countries but also includes Asian, Latin American, and European universities.

The Global Companies Rank Universities by the New York Times is similar to this ranking.

References 

University and college rankings
ParisTech